Elaeocarpus ferruginiflorus is a species of flowering plant in the family Elaeocarpaceae and is endemic to north-east Queensland. It is a small to medium-sized tree, sometimes with buttress roots at the base of the trunk, elliptic to egg-shaped leaves, flowers with five white petals, and dark bluish-grey fruit.

Description
Its young leaves and shoots are densely covered with rust-coloured hairs. The flowers are densely covered with woolly reddish brown hairs.

Taxonomy
Elaeocarpus ferruginiflorus was first formally described in 1933 by Cyril Tenison White in Contributions from the Arnold Arboretum of Harvard University from material collected in on Mount Bellenden Ker.

Distribution and habitat
It is restricted to the area between Cedar Bay National Park and Hinchinbrook Island.

Conservation status
This quandong is listed as of "least concern" under the Queensland Government Nature Conservation Act 1992.

Use in horticulture
This small, slow-growing tree features rusty-coloured new growth.

References

Oxalidales of Australia
ferruginiflorus
Flora of Queensland
Plants described in 1933
Endemic flora of Australia
Taxa named by Cyril Tenison White